Wilhelm Hendrik Franquinet (also known as Willem Hendrik or Guillaume Henri), born at Maastricht in 1785, was instructed by Herreyns at Antwerp. He afterwards visited Germany, and was a drawing-master at his native town from 1804 to 1816. In 1816 he settled in Paris, and in 1821 painted the Bacchanal, and in 1822-34 published a Galerie des Peintres, for which J. Chabert wrote the text. He died in New York in 1854.

References

External link

1785 births
1854 deaths
18th-century Flemish painters
19th-century Flemish painters
Artists from Maastricht
Emigrants from the United Kingdom of the Netherlands to France